Barney Clark may refer to:

 Barney Clark (patient) (1921–1983), recipient of an artificial heart, 1982
 Barney Clark (actor) (born 1993), English actor